Atransferrinemia is an autosomal recessive metabolic disorder in which there is an absence of transferrin, a plasma protein that transports iron through the blood.
Atransferrinemia is characterized by anemia and hemosiderosis in the heart and liver. The iron damage to the heart can lead to heart failure. The anemia is typically microcytic and hypochromic (the red blood cells are abnormally small and pale). Atransferrinemia was first described in 1961 and is extremely rare, with only ten documented cases worldwide.

Symptoms and signs
The presentation of this disorder entails anemia, arthritis, hepatic anomalies, and recurrent infections are clinical signs of the disease. Iron overload occurs mainly in the liver, heart, pancreas, thyroid, and kidney.

Genetics

In terms of genetics of atransferrinemia researchers have identified mutations in the TF gene as a probable cause of this genetic disorder in affected people.

Transferrin is a serum transport protein that transports iron to the reticuloendothelial system for utilization and erythropoiesis, since there is no transferrin in atransferrinemia, serum free iron cannot reach reticuloendothelial cells and there is microcytic anemia. Also, this excess iron deposits itself in the heart, liver and joints, and causes damage. Ferritin, the storage form of iron gets secreted more into the bloodstream so as to bind with the excessive free iron and hence serum ferritin levels rise in this condition

Diagnosis

The diagnosis of atransferrinemia is done via the following means to ascertain if an individual has the condition:
 Blood test(for anemia)
 TF level
 Physical exam
 Genetic test

Types
There are two forms of this condition that causes an absence of transferrin in the affected individual:
 Acquired atransferrinemia
 Congenital atransferrinemia

Treatment

The treatment of atransferrinemia is apotransferrin. The missing protein without iron. Iron treatment is detrimental as it does not correct the anemia and is a cause of secondary hemochromatosis.

See also
 Transferrin

References

Further reading

External links 

Inborn errors of metal metabolism
Iron metabolism
Autosomal recessive disorders
Congenital disorders
Rare diseases
Red blood cell disorders